Mariluz Bermúdez is a Costa Rican television actress and model, known for her roles in the telenovelas Camaleones, Mentir para vivir, Corona de lágrimas and La Gata. She has posed for magazines such as H.

In 2015, Ignacio Sada chose her to play Diana in Simplemente María; Bermúdez said she would only have 24 chapters.

In late March 2016, she was chosen by Salvador Mejía Alejandre to co-star in the telenovela Las amazonas, which premiered on May 16, 2016.

Filmography

References

External links 

Costa Rican female models
Living people
Costa Rican television actresses
Year of birth missing (living people)